Gaston Degy (3 April 1890 – 2 February 1964) was a French racing cyclist. He rode in five editions of the Tour de France, with his best result being 10th in 1922.

Major results

Road
1909
 3rd 
1922
 10th Overall Tour de France
1923
 3rd 
 7th Paris–Roubaix
1924
 7th Paris–Roubaix

Cyclo-cross
1919–1920
 1st  National Championships
1921–1922
 2nd National Championships
1923–1924
 1st 
 2nd National Championships

References

1890 births
1964 deaths
French male cyclists
Place of birth missing